Margaret Anne Kennedy is an American politician who is a member of the New Hampshire House of Representatives. She represents Merrimack County District 7 as a Republican.

References 

Living people
21st-century American politicians
21st-century American women politicians
Women state legislators in New Hampshire
New Hampshire Republicans
Year of birth missing (living people)